1931 Academy Awards may refer to:

 4th Academy Awards, the Academy Awards ceremony that took place November 10, 1931 honoring films released between August 1, 1930, and July 31, 1931
 5th Academy Awards, the Academy Awards ceremony that took place November 18, 1932 honoring films released between August 1, 1931, and July 31, 1932